Manuela Azevedo (born 5 May 1970) is a Portuguese singer. A graduate in law at the University of Coimbra, she is the singer of the Clã band, once integrated the Humanos band.

Participation in other projects:

Ornatos Violeta  (1997) -- «Líbido» e «Letra S»
Três Tristes Tigres  (1999) -- «(Falta) Forma»
Trovante (1999) -- «Perigo» (em Concerto de Reunião / «Uma Noite Só»)
Carinhoso (2002) -- «Carinhoso»
Mola Dudle (2003) -- «Árvore»
José Peixoto (2003) -- «Caixinha de Pandora»
Manuel Paulo (2004) -- Malhas Caídas
Pato Fu (2005) -- «Bom Dia Brasil»
Arnaldo Antunes (2006) -- «Qualquer» e «Num Dia»
Brigada Victor Jara (2006) -- «Tirióni»
Vozes da Rádio (2007) -- «O Pato da Pena Preta»
Vários (2008)-- «Woman»
Júlio Resende (2008) -- «Ir (e Voltar)»
Júlio Pereira (2010) -- «Casa das Histórias»
Virgem Suta (2010) -- «Linhas Cruzadas»
Peixe:Avião (2010) -- «Fios de Fumo»
Pequenos Cantores da Maia (2012) -- «Eu Sou O Pzzim»
Sensi (2013) -- «Introspecção»
Galamdum Galundaína (2016) -- «Tanta Pomba»

Special Concerts

 Blind Zero - 27 + 29 January 1999
 Trovante - Maio 1999
 Porto Cantado - Porto 2001
 Concert of the Count Basie Orchestra - Campo Pequeno - October 2008
 Arnaldo Antunes
 Caríssimas Canções de Sérgio Godinho (2013)
 Deixem o Pimba Em Paz (2013) -  Bruno Nogueira
 Joining Mitchell - Tribute to Joni Mitchell (2013)
 Coppia (2014) - CCB - Hélder Gonçalves e Victor Hugo Pontes

Theater

   "A Lua de Maria Sem" - play with Maria João Luís (2011)
   "Inesquecível Emília" (2012)
   "Baile" (2015)

External links

1970 births
Living people
21st-century Portuguese women singers
University of Coimbra alumni
People from Vila do Conde
Mirandese language